Daniel Wilcox (born March 23, 1977) is a former American football tight end. He has played for the Baltimore Ravens, the New York Jets and the Tampa Bay Buccaneers. He played in the National Football League (NFL) from 2001 to 2008. He attended Appalachian State University.

Early years
Wilcox attended Decatur High School in Decatur, Georgia

College career
Wilcox played college football at Georgia Military Junior College where he graduated with his associate degree. He then transferred to FCS powerhouse Appalachian State University. He finished his career having made 91 receptions for 940 yards and seven touchdowns. He majored in communications and advertisement.

Professional career

New York Jets
Wilcox signed for the New York Jets as an un-drafted free agent on April 26, 2001. In his rookie season he only saw action in two games. 1st NFL game was Monday night football vs the Pittsburgh Steelers. His second career game came in the 1st round of the playoffs vs the Oakland Raiders.

Tampa Bay Buccaneers
On December 17, 2002, Wilcox was signed to the Tampa Bay Buccaneers active roster where they went on to win their first Super Bowl in franchise history. The game was called the Pirate Bowl, being that it featured the "Buccaneers vs the Raiders". In 2003, he started and played in two games, recording one special teams tackle before being released by the Bucs in week three.

Rhein Fire
Played for the Rhein Fire ( NFL Europe ) in 2004. Wore #45 as TE for the Rhein Fire... 20 Catches, 208 Yards & 3 TD's for Rhein Fire.

Baltimore Ravens
Wilcox signed with the Baltimore Ravens on June 21, 2004. In his debut season with the Ravens he played in all 16 games making five starts. He finished the season with 25 receptions for 219 yards. He caught his first NFL touchdown at the Philadelphia Eagles on October 31. In the 2005 season he played in 13 games making three starts before an ankle injury placed him on the injured reserve list. He made 20 receptions for 154 yards and a touchdown. In 2006, he played in 14 games with six starts making 20 catches for 166 yards. He finished the season with three touchdowns, a career-high. On March 1, 2006, Wilcox signed a three-year contract extension. Wilcox showed off his nice hands with a one-handed touchdown catch in week 13 against the Philadelphia Eagles in the 2008 season.

Personal life
Married to the former pageant winner Ms. Belize of New York, Shauna Chin on June 28, 2008. Mr. & Mrs. Daniel Wilcox's wedding was featured on Style Network's Whose Wedding is it Anyway?--episode: And They Lived Happily Ever After." . They married at M&T Bank Stadiumin Baltimore, Maryland. Wilcox has two sons, Tristan Blake (born December 6, 2005) and he welcomed his second son Julian Daniel on May 30, 2010.

External links
 Photos of his wedding day, http://photos.essence.com/galleries/daniel_wilcoxs_wedding_photos
Ravens Player Bio
 Daniel @ Rhein Fire 2004: http://www.us-sport.eu/index.php?site=11&show=article&id=72
MuscleSport Radio interview with Joe Pietaro, 9/29/09

1977 births
Living people
American football tight ends
Appalachian State Mountaineers football players
Baltimore Ravens players
New York Jets players
Tampa Bay Buccaneers players
Players of American football from Atlanta
Junior college football players in the United States
People from Decatur, Georgia